Zavet is a village in Sungurlare Municipality, Burgas Province, in southeastern Bulgaria.

References

Villages in Burgas Province